The Conan Chronicles is a collection of fantasy novels by American writers Robert Jordan, featuring the sword and sorcery hero Conan the Barbarian created by Robert E. Howard.  The book was published in 1995 by Tor Books and collects three novels previously published by Tor.

Contents
 Conan the Invincible
 Conan the Defender
 Conan the Unconquered

References

1995 novels
American fantasy novels
Conan the Barbarian books
Tor Books books